Syracuse Stage is a professional non-profit theater company in Syracuse, New York, United States. It is the premier professional theater in Central New York.  It was founded in 1974 by Arthur Storch, who was its first artistic director.  The company grew out of the Syracuse Repertory Theatre that was founded in the mid-1960s by founders  Marlow G. Burt, Robert B. D'Angelo and Rex Henriot.

In the early 1990s, Tazewell Thompson was artistic director. Robert Moss and Timothy Bond have also served as artistic director.  In 2016, Robert Hupp became artistic director.

Each year, it offers several productions, including one collaboration between Syracuse Stage and the drama department of Syracuse University. It receives grants from the university.

Syracuse Stage is a constituent of the Theatre Communications Group and a member of the League of Resident Theatres, the University Hill Corporation, the Arts and Cultural Leadership Alliance, and the East Genesee Regent Association.

John D. Archbold Theatre
This facility, named after John Dana Archbold (University trustee 19761993 and the grandson of John D. Archbold), cost $1.3 million.

The theatre has a 36–40 feet wide proscenium;  the stage is 30 feet deep.  It is lit by 215 Source Fours, 16 fresnels, 36 par cans, and 22 16x22 lekos.

References

External links

Syracuse University
Theatre companies in New York (state)
Theatres in New York (state)
Culture of Syracuse, New York